San José de Barlovento (formerly San José de Río Chico) is a city in the state of Miranda, Venezuela. It is the capital of Andrés Bello Municipality, Miranda.

Cities in Miranda (state)